Unborn in the USA: Inside the War on Abortion is a 2007 documentary film containing interviews with anti-abortion activists across the United States. Its tagline is, "How the pro-lifers are winning". The film was started as a thesis project by Stephen Fell and Will Thompson, students at Rice University.

The film chronicles major events such as the annual March for Life and the 2004 March for Women's Lives, and has interviews with members of the Army of God and other anti-abortion activists.

References

External links
 
 
 Official web page - First Run Features

2007 films
Documentary films about abortion
Abortion in the United States